The Embraer E-Jet family is a series of four-abreast narrow-body short- to medium-range twin-engine jet airliners designed and produced by the Brazilian aerospace manufacturer Embraer.

The E-Jet was designed as a complement to the preceding ERJ family, Embraer's first jet-powered regional jet; designed to carry between 66 and 124 passengers, it was larger than any prior aircraft built by the company. The project's existence was revealed in early 1997, and was formally introduced at the Paris Air Show two years later. On 19 February 2002, the first prototype E-Jet conducted its maiden flight; later that year, quantity production of the type commenced. In early March 2004, the first E170 deliveries were made to LOT Polish Airlines.

The E-Jet series has been a commercial success primarily due to its ability to efficiently serve lower-demand routes while offering many of the same amenities and features of larger jets. Initial teething issues, including hydraulic and engine-specific ones, were quickly overcome, and Embraer rapidly expanded its product support division for better global coverage. The E-Jet family is commonly used by both mainline and regional airlines around the world and has become particularly popular with regional airlines in the United States. It has also served as the basis for the Embraer Lineage 1000 business jet. During the 2010s, Embraer developed a second generation of regional jets, the E-Jet E2 family, derived from the original E-Jet family. However, the E175 remains in production, to fulfill demand from regional airlines in the United States.

Development

Background
During the 1990s, the Brazilian aerospace manufacturer Embraer had introduced the ERJ family, its first jet-powered regional jet. As demand for the ERJ series proved strong even early on, the company decided that it could not rely on one family of aircraft alone and examined its options for producing a complementary regional jet, including designs that would be larger and more advanced than its preceding aircraft.

During March 1997, Embraer made its first public disclosure that it was studying a new 70-seat aircraft, which was initially referred to as the EMB 170; this reveal was issued concurrently with the announcement of the development of the ERJ 135. As originally conceived, the EMB 170 was to feature a new wing and larger-diameter fuselage mated to the nose and cockpit of the ERJ 145. The proposed derivative would have cost $450 million to develop.
While Alenia, Aerospatiale and British Aerospace through AI(R) were studying the Airjet 70 based on the ATR 42/72 fuselage for a  range, AI(R) and Embraer were studying a joint development of a 70-seater jet since their separate projects were not yet launched.

In February 1999, Embraer announced it had abandoned the derivative approach in favour of an all-new design. On 14 June 1999, the E-Jet family was formally launched at the Paris Air Show, initially using the twin designations ERJ-170 and ERJ-190; these were subsequently changed to Embraer 170 and Embraer 190 respectively. The launch customers for the airliner were the French airline Régional, which placed ten orders and five options for the E170, and the Swiss airline Crossair, which had ordered 30 E170s and 30 E190s.

During July 2000, production of components for the construction of both the prototype and test airframes began. Difficulties with the advanced avionics selected for the aircraft, supplied by the American company Honeywell, led to delays in the development schedule; originally, the first flight had been set to take place during 2000. On 29 October 2001, the first prototype PP-XJE was rolled out at São José dos Campos, Brazil.

Intro flight
On 19 February 2002, the first prototype performed its maiden flight, marking the beginning of a multi-year flight test campaign involving a total of six prototypes. In May 2002, the aircraft was displayed to the public at the Regional Airline Association convention. During that same year, full-rate production of the E-Jet commenced; this activity was centred around a recently-completed factory built by Embraer at its São José dos Campos base.

During June 2003, the first flight of the E175 took place. In April 2003, jetBlue placed an order for 100 Embraer 190s, the deliveries of which commenced two years later.

Following several delays in the certification process, the E170 received type certification from the civil aviation authorities of Brazil, Europe and the United States in February 2004.

Production
In 2008, the 400th E-jet was delivered to Republic Airways in the United States. In September 2009, the 600th E-jet was delivered to LOT Polish Airlines.
On 10 October 2012, Embraer delivered the 900th E-Jet to Kenya Airways, its 12th E-Jet. On 13 September 2013, the delivery of the 1,000th E-Jet, an E175 to Republic Airways for American Eagle, was marked by a ceremony held at the Embraer factory in São José dos Campos, with a special "1,000th E-Jet" decal above the cabin windows.

On 6 December 2017, the 1,400th E-Jet was delivered, an E175; it had a backlog of over 150 firm orders on 30 September 2017.

On 18 December 2018, Embraer delivered the 1,500th E-Jet, an E175 to Alaska Air subsidiary Horizon Air, as Embraer claims an 80% market share of the North American 76-seaters. By this point, the fleet had completed 25 million flight hours in 18 million cycles (an average of  h) with a 99.9% dependability.

E-Jets Second Generation

In November 2011, Embraer announced that it would develop revamped versions of the E-Jet to be called the E-Jet E2 family. The new jets would feature improved engines that would be more fuel efficient and take advantage of new technologies. Beyond the new engines, the E2 family would also feature new wings, improved avionics, and other improvements to the aircraft. The move came amid a period of high global fuel costs and better positions Embraer as competitors introduced new and more fuel efficient jets, including the Mitsubishi Regional Jet. The new aircraft family also includes a much larger variant, the E195-E2 capable of carrying between 120 and 146 passengers. This jet better positions Embraer against the competing Airbus A220 aircraft. The PW1000G was previously selected for use on competing aircraft.

In January 2013, Embraer selected the Pratt & Whitney PW1000G geared turbofan engine to power the E2 family. On 28 February 2018, The E190-E2 received its type certificate from the ANAC, FAA and EASA. It was scheduled to enter service in the second quarter of 2018.

Design

The Embraer E-Jet family is composed of two main commercial families and a business jet variant. The smaller E170 and E175 make up the base model aircraft, while the E190 and E195 are stretched versions, being powered by different engines and furnished with larger wing, horizontal stabilizer and landing gear structures. From the onset, the E-Jet had been designed to be stretched. The E170 and E175 share 95% commonality, as do the E190 and E195; the two families share near 89% commonality, maintaining identical fuselage cross-sections and avionics fitouts. The E190 and E195 possess capacities similar to the initial versions of the McDonnell Douglas DC-9 and Boeing 737. All members of the E-Jet family are available in baseline, long range (LR), and advanced range (AR) models, the latter being intended for long routes with limited passenger numbers. 

These engines have been designed to minimise noise and emission outputs, exceeding the requirements established by the International Civil Aviation Organization; the relatively low acoustic signature has enabled the E-Jet to be operated from airports that have imposed strict noise restrictions, such as London City Airport. The type is also equipped with winglets that reduce fuel burn and thereby improve operational efficiency.

The E-Jet family is equipped with advanced avionics, which includes a fly-by-wire flight control system. The flight deck is furnished with the Honeywell Primus Epic Electronic flight instrument system (EFIS) suite and has been designed to facilitate a common type rating, enabling flight crews to be readily moved between different members of the family without the need for any retraining/recertifying and providing greater flexibility to operators. Early operations of the E-Jet were frequently troubled by avionics issues; by September 2008, Honeywell had issued software updates that sought to rectify the encountered issues.

The main cabin is configured with four-abreast seating (2+2) as standard, and features a "double-bubble" design that Embraer has purpose-developed for its commercial passenger jets to provide stand-up headroom. The dimensions of the cabin were intentionally comparable to the narrowbody airliners of Airbus and Boeing to permit greater comfort levels than most regional aircraft. Considerable attention to detail was reportedly paid by Embraer to elevating the type's passenger appeal. Many operators have chosen to outfit their aircraft with amenities such as Wi-Fi and at-seat power outlets.

Operational history

In early March 2004, the first E170 deliveries were made to LOT Polish Airlines, other customers to receive early deliveries were Alitalia and US Airways-subsidiary MidAtlantic Airways. On 17 March 2004, LOT operated the first commercial flight of an E-Jet, which flew from Warsaw to Vienna. Within four years, LOT was sufficiently pleased with the type to order 12 additional E175s. Launch customer Crossair had in the meantime ceased to exist after its takeover of Swissair, leading to the cancellation of these orders. Furthermore, fellow launch customer Régional chose to defer its order, not receiving its first E-jet—an E190LR—until 2006.

During July 2005, the first E175 was delivered to Air Canada, entering revenue service with the airline that same month. In April 2013, Air Canada begun the transfer of its 15-strong E175 fleet to subsidiary Sky Regional Airlines, this reorganisation was completed during September 2013. By July 2020, approximately 25 million passengers had flown on the Canadian fleet over a cumulative 650,000 flight hours, while a total of 25 E175s were in service on both domestic and transborder flights into the US, which were then being flown under the Air Canada Express branding. In March 2021, Air Canada announced its intention to consolidate all regional flying under the Jazz branding, thereby ending its affiliation between Sky Regional Airlines and Air Canada; accordingly, all of the E175s were transferred to Jazz.

Early operations of the E-Jet were not problem-free: the American operator JetBlue reported engine troubles with its fleet, while cold start hydraulic issues were experienced by Air Canada. Embraer had to undertake a rapid expansion of its product support network in order to satisfy the needs of its mainline operators; by October 2014, the company had two directly-owned service centers, alongside nine authorized centers and 26 independent MRO organizations around the globe, while directly employing 1,200 staff for product support alone. In response to customer demands, the company also developed web-based support.

BA CityFlyer, a subsidiary of British Airways, operates a fleet of 21 E190s, typically flying routes from London City Airport to various destinations both within the United Kingdom and continental Europe. CityFlier has publicly stated that a key factor in it opting for the E-Jet over competitors such as the De Havilland Canada Dash 8 was due to its greater speed. The procurement of E-Jets by CityFlier led to other competing British regional airliners taking interest in the type; on 20 July 2010, Flybe ordered 35 E175s valued at US$1.3 billion (£850 million), alogn with options for 65 more (valued at $2.3 bn/£1.5 bn) and purchase rights for a further 40 (valued at $1.4 bn/£0.9 bn), deliveries of which commenced in November 2011.

On 14 October 2017, an Airlink E190-100IGW with 78 passengers aboard inaugurated the first scheduled commercial airline service in history to Saint Helena in the South Atlantic Ocean, arriving at Saint Helena Airport after a flight of about six hours from Johannesburg, South Africa, with a stop at Windhoek, Namibia. The flight began a once-per-week scheduled service by Airlink between Johannesburg and Saint Helena using E190 aircraft. The inaugural flight was only the second commercial flight to Saint Helena in the island's history, and the first since a chartered Airlink Avro RJ85 landed at Saint Helena Airport on 3 May 2017.

Variants

E170
The E170 is the smallest aircraft in the E-Jet family and was the first to enter revenue service in March 2004. As of 2017, the E170 is out of production. The E170 typically seats around 72 passengers in a typical single class configuration, 66 in a dual class configuration, and up to 78 in a high density configuration. The E170 directly competed with the Bombardier CRJ700 and loosely with the turboprop Bombardier Q400.

The jet is powered with General Electric CF34-8E engines of 14,200 pounds (62.28 kN) thrust each.

E175 

The E175 is a slightly stretched version of the E170 and first entered revenue service with launch customer Air Canada in July 2005. The E175 typically seats around 78 passengers in a typical single class configuration, 76 in a dual-class configuration, and up to 88 in a high-density configuration. Like the E170, It is powered with General Electric CF34-8E engines of 14,200 pounds (62.28 kN) of thrust each. It competed with the Bombardier CRJ900 in the market segment previously occupied by the earlier BAe 146 and Fokker 70. , it is the only aircraft currently produced in this market segment.

The E175 was initially equipped with the same style of winglets as the rest of the E-Jet family.  This was changed starting in 2014 to wider, angled winglets as part of an efficiency improvement package. The angled winglets increase the wingspan from 26.00m (85 ft 4 in) to 28.65m (93 ft 11 in). This winglet change was only made available to the E175 version.

In late 2017, Embraer announced the E175SC (special configuration), limited to 70 seats like the E170 to take advantage of the E175 performance improvements, but still comply with US airline scope clauses limiting operators to 70 seats. Embraer is marketing the E175SC as a replacement for the older 70-seat Bombardier CRJ700 with better efficiency and a larger first class.

In 2018, a new E175 has a value of US$27 million, projected to fall to US$3–8 million 13 years later due to their concentration in the US with more than 450 in service out of 560, with Republic and SkyWest operating over 120 each, Compass 35 and Envoy Air 90, after the similar experience with the CRJ200 and ERJ 145 demonstrates the limited remarketing opportunities.

, the E175 remains in production, with strong demand from regional airlines in the United States, which cannot order the newer, but heavier E175-E2 due to scope clause restrictions on maximum takeoff weight.

E190 and E195

The E190/195 models are larger stretches of the E170/175 models fitted with a new, larger wing, a larger horizontal stabilizer, two emergency overwing exits, and a new engine. The engines and engine nacelles are supplied by General Electric. The engines are equipped with full authority digital engine control (FADEC). The fully redundant, computerized management system continuously optimizes the engine performance resulting in reduced fuel consumption and maintenance requirements. The aircraft carries 13,000 kg of fuel and is fitted with a Parker Hannifin fuel system.

Two slightly different versions of the E190 and the E195 exist: LR and AR.

The aircraft is equipped with a Hamilton Sundstrand auxiliary power unit and electrical system. The GE CF34-10E, rated at 18,500 lb (82.30 kN), is the only powerplant offered for the aircraft. These aircraft compete with the Bombardier CRJ-1000 and Airbus A220-100, the Boeing 717, 737-500, and 737-600, and the Airbus A318. It can carry up to 100 passengers in a two-class configuration or up to 124 in the single-class high-density configuration.

On 12 March 2004, the first flight of the E190 (PP-XMA) took place, while the first flight of the E195 (PP-XMJ) occurred on 7 December of that year. The launch customer of the E190 was New York-based low-cost carrier JetBlue with 100 orders options in 2003 and took its first delivery in 2005. British low-cost carrier Flybe was the first operator of the E195, had 14 orders and 12 options, and started E195 operations on 22 September 2006. Flybe have since decided that they would remove the aircraft from their fleet in favour of the Dash 8 Q400 and Embraer 175, in an effort to reduce costs, by 2020.

Air Canada operated 45 E190 aircraft fitted with 9 business-class and 88 economy-class seats as part of its primary fleet. They were retired in May 2020. American Airlines operated E190s until 2020. JetBlue and Georgian Airways operate the E190 as part of their own fleet. Austrian Airlines have 17 E195 aircraft in their mainline fleet.

By 2018, early E190s were valued at under US$10 million and could be leased for less than US$100,000 per month, while the most recent aircraft were worth US$30 million and could be leased for less than US$200,000 per month.

Freighter conversions 
On 7 March 2022, Embraer confirmed their intent to enter the cargo market, offering E-190s and E-195s converted to freighters. These will make their first flights in 2024.

Embraer Lineage 1000

On 2 May 2006, Embraer announced plans for the business jet variant of the E190, the Embraer Lineage 1000 (type name ERJ190-100 ECJ). It was certified by the US Federal Aviation Administration on 7 January 2009. The first two production aircraft were delivered in December 2008.

Undeveloped variants 
Embraer considered producing an aircraft which was known as the E195X, a stretched version of the E195. It would have seated approximately 130 passengers. The E195X was apparently a response to an American Airlines request for an aircraft to replace its McDonnell Douglas MD-80s. Embraer abandoned plans for the 195X in May 2010, following concerns that its flight range would be too short.

Commercial names and official model designations
The commercial names used for the E170 and E190 families differ from the official model designations, as used (for instance) with the Type-Certificates, and in national registries.

Operators 

, the four largest operators of E-Jet family were Republic Airways (218), SkyWest Airlines (205), Envoy Air (116), and Mesa Airlines (80).

Orders and deliveries

List of Embraer's E-Jet family deliveries and orders:

Source: Embraer's order book as of December 31, 2022.

Accidents and incidents

The E-Jet has been involved in 21 incidents, including eight hull losses:

Accidents with fatalities 
 On 24 August 2010, Henan Airlines Flight 8387, an E190 that departed from Harbin, People's Republic of China, crash-landed about 1 km short of the runway at Yichun Lindu Airport, resulting in 44 deaths.
 On 29 June 2012, during Tianjin Airlines Flight 7554, six passengers carrying explosives stood up and announced a hijacking, but they were subdued by other passengers. The E190 returned to Hotan Airport where the hijackers were apprehended and two of them later died in hospital from injuries received in the fight. 
 On 29 November 2013, LAM Mozambique Airlines Flight 470, an E190, crashed in Namibia, killing all 33 aboard (27 passengers, six crew members) by the deliberate actions of the pilot. The first officer reportedly left the cockpit to use the bathroom. He was then locked out by the captain, who dramatically reduced the aircraft's altitude and ignored various automated warnings ahead of the high-speed impact.
 On 31 December 2022, a baggage handler employed by Piedmont Airlines, an American Airlines regional carrier, was killed on the ramp at Montgomery Regional Airport when sucked into the jet engine of an Embraer 175 which was scheduled to fly as American Airlines Flight 3408.

Hull losses with no fatalities 
 On 17 July 2007, Aero República Flight 7330 overran the runway while landing at Simón Bolívar International Airport in Santa Marta, Colombia. The E190 slid down an embankment off the side of the runway and came to rest with the nose in shallow water. The aircraft was damaged beyond repair, but all 60 aboard evacuated unharmed.
 On 16 September 2011, an E190 operated by TAME landed long and ran off the end of the runway at Mariscal Sucre International Airport in Quito, colliding with approach equipment and a brick wall. The crew reportedly failed to adhere to the manufacturer's procedures in the event of a flap malfunction, continuing the approach in spite of the aircraft's condition. Eleven of the 103 aboard received minor injuries, and the aircraft was written off.
 On 31 July 2018, Aeroméxico Connect Flight 2431, an E190 bound for Mexico City, crashed in Durango, Mexico shortly after takeoff. 99 passengers and 4 crew were on board. Although there were no fatalities, the aircraft was destroyed by the ensuing fire. The probable cause was attributed to "loss of control [...] by low altitude windshear that caused a loss of speed and lift" with contributing factors from the crew and the Navigation Services.
 On 11 November 2018 Air Astana Flight 1388 on a flight from Alverca Airbase, Portugal, to Almaty suffered severe control issues including flipping over and diving sharply. The crew activated the direct mode for flight controls which allowed sufficient control to make an emergency landing on the third attempt at Beja Airbase in Portugal with serious damage sustained during these high-G maneuvers. It was subsequently written-off and broken up. The investigation revealed that the aileron cables were installed incorrectly, causing reversal of aileron controls. The investigation blamed the manufacturer of the airplane for the poorly written maintenance instructions, the supervising authorities for lack of oversight over the maintenance crew, who lacked the skill to perform the maintenance, and the flight crew for failing to notice the condition during pre-flight control checks.

Other incidents 

 On 18 February 2007, Shuttle America Flight 6448 (an E170 operating for Delta Connection) ran off the runway on landing at Cleveland Hopkins International Airport in poor visibility during a snowstorm. None of the 75 passengers and crew aboard were injured, and the aircraft, while significantly damaged, was repaired and returned to service.
 On 4 December 2016, SkyWest Airlines flight 5588, an E175 operating as a United Express flight from Houston Intercontinental Airport to Monterrey, Mexico, was diverted to San Antonio International Airport after experiencing an abnormal landing gear indication. Upon landing, the nose gear of the aircraft collapsed, and the aircraft came to rest on runway 04. Of the 51 passengers and 4 crew members, only one minor injury was sustained during the evacuation. During recovery of the aircraft, it was discovered that a failed downlock spring on the nose gear had prevented the landing gear from locking in the down position.
 On 12 May 2019, Myanmar National Airlines E190 flight UB-103 to Mandalay, Myanmar had to land without the nosewheel, which failed to deploy. There were no casualties reported among the 82 passengers and seven crew.
 On 6 November 2019, a Republic Airways E175 operating American Eagle Flight 4439 returned to Atlanta Hartsfield-Jackson International Airport after suffering severe controllability issues after takeoff: ATC flight data recorded the crew stating a "trim runaway" and a "stalling situation".

Specifications

See also

Notes

References

Citations

Bibliography
 Eden, Paul E. "The World's Most Powerful Civilian Aircraft." Rosen Publishing Group, 2016. ISBN 1-4994-6589-0.

External links

 Official Embraer E-Jets website
 
 
 
 
 

2000s Brazilian airliners
Embraer aircraft
Twinjets
Aircraft first flown in 2002